James O'Brien (1806-1882) was a nineteenth-century Irish barrister, politician and judge.

He was born in Granard, County Longford, the fourth son of James O'Brien and Margaret Long, daughter of Peter Long of Waterford. His father died in February 1806, around the time James was born, and his mother remarried Cornelius O'Brien, MP for Clare, the County Clare politician and landowner. He went to school in Dublin, and entered the University of Dublin, where he graduated BA in 1829 with a gold medal in science. He entered Gray's Inn in 1831 and was called to the Irish Bar in 1831, becoming Queen's Counsel in 1841.

He entered politics as a Whig and was elected to the House of Commons as member for Limerick City in 1854; he was re-elected in 1857. He became Third Serjeant in 1848 and Second Serjeant in 1851. In 1858 he was appointed a judge of the Court of Queen's Bench (Ireland) and held that office until his death. He died at his townhouse at St Stephen's Green; he also had a house in Dalkey.

He married Margaret Segrave in 1836 and they had five children: John, Anne, Emily, Clara, Mary and Margaret. Probably his most eminent relative was his nephew Peter O'Brien, 1st Baron O'Brien, Lord Chief Justice of Ireland 1889–1913, who was  the son of his elder brother John O'Brien MP and Ellen Murphy.

Arms

References

Sources 

 Ball, F. Elrington; The Judges in Ireland 1221-1921 London John Murray 1926 Vol. II

1806 births
1882 deaths
People from County Longford
Members of Gray's Inn
Alumni of Trinity College Dublin
UK MPs 1852–1857
UK MPs 1857–1859
Members of the Parliament of the United Kingdom for County Limerick constituencies (1801–1922)
Judges of the High Court of Justice in Ireland
Serjeants-at-law (Ireland)
Whig (British political party) MPs for Irish constituencies